Senator Hammer may refer to:

Emerson Hammer (1856–1940), Washington State Senate
Frederic E. Hammer (1909–1980), New York State Senate